The 1994 Vuelta a España was the 49th Edition of the Vuelta a España, one of cycling's Grand Tours. The Vuelta started on April 25 with a short  prologue around the Spanish city of Valladolid. The race came to a close on May 15 with a flat stage that stretched from Palazuelos de Eresma to the Spanish capital of Madrid. Seventeen teams entered the race, which was won by Tony Rominger of the  team. Second and third respectively were the Spanish riders Mikel Zarrabeitia and Pedro Delgado.

Tony Rominger became the first rider to win the Vuelta a España three consecutive times. Amongst the race's other classifications, Laurent Jalabert of the  team won the points classification,  rider Luc Leblanc won the mountains classification, Mauro Radaelli of the Brescialat team won the intermediate sprints classification, and Amore & Vita rider Alessio Di Basco won the special sprints classification.  finished as the winners of the team classification, which ranked each of the twenty teams contesting the race by lowest cumulative time.

Race preview and favorites

Tony Rominger, winner of the past two editions, was once again the favorite. Alex Zülle the previous year's runner up and Pedro Delgado, twice winner of the Vuelta, were expected to be his main rivals.

Teams

A total of 17 teams were invited to participate in the 1994 Vuelta a España. Each team sent a squad of ten riders, so the Vuelta began with a peloton of 170 cyclists. Out of the 170 riders that started this edition of the Vuelta a España, a total of 121 riders made it to the finish in Madrid.

The 17 teams that took part in the race were:

Route and stages

The 1994 Vuelta a España began with a brief  individual time trial that circuited the city of Valladolid. There were a total of eight stages that held many high mountains, while there was only one hilly stage that contained climbs of lesser degree. The nine remaining stages were primarily flat.

Of the stages that contained mountains, six contained summit finishes: stage 6 to Sierra Nevada, stage 10 to Andorra-Arcalís, stage 11 to Cerler, stage 14 to Sierra de la Demanda, stage 16 to Lakes of Covadonga, and stage 17 to Monte Naranco.

Race overview

Rominger showed from the very start that he was unlikely to be easily beaten, as he won the prologue by a large margin.
On the sixth stage, ending at the top of the 2700m climb of the Sierra Nevada, Rominger took advantage of an attack by youngster Mikel Zarrabeitia to leave all other riders behind and win the stage. After only one mountain stage Rominger was now the leader by over two minutes over his rivals.

In the second week, Rominger put his overall win beyond doubt, gaining another two minutes on his rivals at the Benidorm individual time trial and taking two more stage wins, albeit without much time gain, on the mountaintop finishes at Cerler and the Alto de la Cruz de la Demanda.

Even though the overall winner was set in stone, there was a spirited fight for second and third places between ONCE leader Zülle and Banesto riders Delgado and Zarrabeitia. This fight was mostly decided when Zülle cracked on the Lagos de Covadonga climb and lost several minutes. This very stage marked the beginning of Laurent Jalabert's transformation from sprinter into GC contender as he took the stage win.

In Segovia, on the outskirts of Madrid, Marino Alonso took the only stage win by a Spanish rider in this edition of the Vuelta. It was also in Segovia that the penultima stage was held, a 53 km individual time trial. Zülle set the fastest intermediate times and looked set to win the stage and finish on the podium, but bad luck struck, and after four consecutive mechanical issues he lost any chance of doing so. Rominger took his 6th stage win.

The final stage, ending in Madrid, resulted in Jalabert's seventh stage win, a record that also netted him the points classification.
Also a record was Rominger's third Vuelta win. He also held the leader's jersey from start to finish (which only three riders had achieved before) and won six stages. The Banesto duo of Zarrabeitia and Delgado accompanied him on the podium.

It was the last time that the race was held in late spring as from 1995 onwards the race was held in September.

Classification leadership

Final standings

General classification

Points classification

Mountains classification

Team classification

Intermediate sprints classification

Special sprints classification

References

External links
La Vuelta (Official site in Spanish, English, and French)

 
1994 in Spanish road cycling
1994
April 1994 sports events in Europe
May 1994 sports events in Europe